Sonja Åkesson (19April 19265May 1977) was a Swedish poet, writer, and artist born in Buttle, Gotland.

Life 
Sonja Åkesson first discovered her talent for writing at 28 after moving to Stockholm, after her divorce from Nils Westberg, a carpenter. They had two children at the time of the divorce and Sonja was expecting a baby (not her husband’s). The baby died from leukemia at the age of two.

In 1956, Sonja married Bo Holmberg and had her fourth child, Mikael. The following year she published her first collection of poems: Situationer ("Situations"). In 1963 she became a household name in Sweden after publishing Husfrid. She became known for her distinct style of writing, describing daily life and commenting on society. The feminist movement embraced Åkesson's work and often cited it. The most famous of her poems is probably "äktenskapsfrågan" (the question of marriage). This is often referred to as "vara vit mans slav" (to be the slave of a white man) as this is repeated throughout the poem.

After nine years of marriage, she divorced Bo Holmberg in 1965. She married Jarl Hammarberg, a Swedish artist and poet, and gave birth to her fifth child, Gertie. Sonja Åkesson moved to Halmstad in the 1970s after suffering from mental illness, and in 1977 she died from liver cancer.

Works 

Her works include:

Poetry 
 Situationer (1957)
 Glasveranda (1959)
 Husfrid (1963)
 Pris (1968)
 Sagan om Siv (1974)

Prose 
 Skvallerspegel (1960)
 Leva livet (1961)
 Efter balen (1962)

Her manuscripts and other papers are held within the Women’s History Collections, Gothenburg University, Sweden.

References

Further reading
 

1926 births
1977 deaths
People from Gotland
Swedish-language poets
Deaths from cancer in Sweden
20th-century Swedish poets
Deaths from liver cancer
20th-century Swedish women writers